V. bakeri may refer to:
 Vanilla bakeri, a plant species found in Cuba
 Vermicularia bakeri, a plant pathogen
 Viola bakeri, a flowering plant species

See also
 Bakeri (disambiguation)